Cyrtodactylus bengkhuaiai is a species of gecko endemic to India.

The lizard was named in 2021 after a Mizo chieftain who had fought the British Empire over 150 years before.

References

Cyrtodactylus
Reptiles described in 2021
Endemic fauna of India